Where We All Belong is the third album by The Marshall Tucker Band (credited to “Marshall Tucker Band”). It is a double album; disc one is a studio album and disc two is a live album, featuring extensive jamming by the band and guest fiddle player, Charlie Daniels, on "24 Hours at a Time". Album two was recorded live at the Performing Arts Center in Milwaukee, Wisconsin on July 11, 1974. A printing error in the liner notes states  Toy Caldwell credited as playing lead guitar and vocals on "Can't You See."  "Can't You See" was actually recorded at this show, but would be retained for release on the band's following album, Searchin' for a Rainbow, in 1975.  Album one was recorded in 1974 in Macon, Georgia at Capricorn Studios.

Track listing
All songs written by Toy Caldwell, except where noted.

Side one
"This Ol' Cowboy" - 6:42
"Low Down Ways" - 3:00
"In My Own Way" - 7:17

Side two
"How Can I Slow Down" - 3:19
"Where a Country Boy Belongs" - 4:32
"Now She's Gone" (Toy and Tommy Caldwell) - 4:20
"Try One More Time" - 4:46

Side three
"Ramblin'" - 6:13
"24 Hours at a Time" - 13:57

Side four
"Everyday (I Have the Blues)" (Peter Chatman) - 11:48
"Take the Highway" - 7:26

CD reissue bonus track
"See You Later, I'm Gone" (Live at Winterland Auditorium in San Francisco, CA, September 1973) - 3:13

Personnel
Doug Gray – lead vocals, percussion
Toy Caldwell – electric and acoustic guitars, steel guitar, lead vocals on "This Ol' Cowboy" and "Everyday (I Have the Blues)"
Tommy Caldwell – bass guitar, backing vocals
George McCorkle – electric and acoustic guitars, banjo
Jerry Eubanks – flute, alto, baritone and tenor saxophone, backing vocals
Paul Riddle – drums

Additional musicians
 Charlie Daniels – fiddle on “24 Hours At a Time” and "This Ol' Cowboy"
 Elvin Bishop – slide guitar on "Where a Country Boy Belongs"
 Johnny Vernazza – slide guitar on "Where a Country Boy Belongs"
 Billy Sanders – harmonica, rhythm guitar
 Paul Hornsby – piano, organ, clavinet
 Earl Ford – trombone
 Jerry Joseph – conga
 Steve Madaio – trumpet
 Sam McPhearson – harp
 Andy Stein – fiddle

References

Marshall Tucker Band albums
1974 albums
1974 live albums
Albums produced by Paul Hornsby
Capricorn Records albums
Capricorn Records live albums